Aste Nagusia or "The Great Week" is the main festival of Bilbao, Basque Country, Spain, which is celebrated annually over 9 days beginning on the first Saturday following 15 August, the festivity of the Assumption of Our Lady.

History
The Great Week has been held annually since 1978, and the August celebrations already coincided with the visit of the circus to the city, the fairgrounds, the bullfights, the boxing matches and the traditional dance performances. The origin of this model was the organization of a contest of ideas by the department store El Corte Inglés – through Kiko Mochales – for the festival, which was awarded with a monetary prize of a hundred thousand pesetas, in order to introduce a new participatory model that would revitalise the backwards festival that had been established during Francoism.

This includes the first rocket launched by the txupinera, and the reading of the festival proclamation by the herald.

In 1980, the then Mayor Jon Castañares (from the Basque Nationalist Party) decided that the council would organize the Great Week on their own.

In 1983, the  had to be suspended due to a severe flooding caused by the overflow of the Nervion-Ibaizabal.

On July 2, 2009, the festival was chosen in a popular vote organized by The International Bureau of Cultural Capitals as one of the 10+2 Intangible Cultural Heritage Treasures of Spain, ranking first.

It was cancelled in 2020 & 2021 due to the COVID-19 pandemic.

Groups
Created with the festival model of 1978, they are troupes of people that come together to energize the festival through the "" or festive tents they install in the El Arenal fairground, with music and different activities during the nine days of the Aste Nagusia.
They are associated to different political, social, sport or neighbourhood interests.

In addition to energizing the Aste Nagusia in August, the  also invigorate the Carnival festivities in February/March and the Santo Tomás Fair on 21 December.

The  and the herald
Each year, she is chosen from the female members of the festival troupe that has been elected in a draw organized by the Coordination of Comparsas, which does not consider the troupes already favored in previous years.

In that year, given the significant increase in her work, a "reserve"  was chosen, which corresponded to the group , not being repeated since as not considered necessary.

They are kept in the City Hall and are handed by the outgoing  to the newly elected one every year.

In 1985, the Coordination of Comparsas covered the cost of a specific uniform for the position, designed by Alejandro Gutiérrez. It consists of a red tunic with large shoulder pads, with bright black collar, epaulets and a double row of gold buttons; worsted black skirt, tubed; red beret with the coat of arms of Bilbao embroidery, and black patent leather shoes with white socks. The uniform of the  has similarities with the Carlist uniform from the troops that besieged and bombarded during the first Siege of Bilbao, especially its characteristic red beret.

Marijaia

Marijaia is characterised as a portable structure in the shape of a plump lady with her arms always raised in celebration. She was created on August 19, 1978, by Mari Puri Herrero, who designed and built it in just five days, after the commission of the Festival Committee.

Music
Concerts are an important part of the Great Week. The official program has included concerts by artists such as Ainhoa Cantalapiedra, Alpha Blondy, Amaral, Ana Torroja, Andy & Lucas, Antonio Orozco, Asian Dub Foundation, Augustus Pablo, Baccara, Barón Rojo, Basque Dub Foundation, Benito Lertxundi, Berri Txarrak, Burning Spear, Carlinhos Brown, Carlos Núñez, Carmen París, Chambao, Chenoa, Chico y Chica, Coldplay, Coti, Dani Martín, Diego Martín, Doctor Deseo, Dover, Egan, El Arrebato, Earth Wind and Fire, El Consorcio, El Mentón de Foggarty, Fangoria, Fito & Fitipaldis, Fundación Tony Manero, Gari, Gatibu, Guano Apes, Hiru Truku, Hombres G, Iggy Pop and The Stooges, Iguana Tango, Ismael Serrano, Jeanette, Jorge Drexler, Juan Magán, Juanes, Karina, Ken Zazpi, Kepa Junkera, La Otxoa, La Mala Rodríguez, La 5ª Estación, La sonrisa de Julia, Liam O'Flynn, Los Del Río, Luar na Lubre, M Clan, Mägo de Oz, Mano Negra, Manu Chao, Marlango, Melendi, Merche Micky, Miguel Bosé, Morodo, Negu Gorriak, Nena Daconte, OBK, Orishas, Pennywise, Pereza, Pet Shop Boys, Pignoise, Potato, Primal Scream, Public Enemy, Reincidentes, Ruper Ordorika, Safri Duo, Santiago Auserón, Sebastián Yatra, Septeto Santiaguero, Sergio Dalma, Simple Minds, Ska-P, Sólo los Solo, Su ta Gar, The Pogues, The Prodigy, Tony Ronald, Tote King, Travis, Turbonegro, Urtz, Violadores del Verso, among others.

Apart from the concerts in the official program, the private initiative – mainly from the festival groups and the hospitality industry – also organize alternative concerts, by artists such of Banda Bassotti, Geronación, La Otxoa, Macarrada, Skalariak, Su ta Gar, El Reno Renardo, among others.

Fireworks
During the festival, the Villa de Bilbao International Fireworks Competition is held; each night a pyrotechnic company shows a program. The festival is closed by an exhibition program.

References

External links
 Official page at the Bilbao website.

Bilbao
Annual events in Spain
1978 establishments in Spain
Recurring events established in 1978
Festivals in Spain
Summer events in Spain
Basque festivals